Barfiyan (also Romanized as Barfīyān and Barfīān; also known as Bartiān) is a village in Qolqol Rud Rural District, Qolqol Rud District, Tuyserkan County, Hamadan Province, Iran. At the 2006 census, its population was 177, in 45 families.

References 

Populated places in Tuyserkan County